Repton may refer to:

Places

In England 
Repton, a parish and village in Derbyshire
Repton Abbey, a former Benedictine Abbey
Repton Priory, a former Augustinian Priory
Repton Rural District, a rural district in Derbyshire from 1894 to 1974
Repton School
Repton School Ground, a cricket ground
Repton Prep, a co-educational private school in Foremark, Derbyshire

In the United States 
Repton (Louisville, Kentucky), a historic house listed on the National Register of Historic Places
Repton, Alabama, a town in the United States
Repton Mills, an unincorporated community in Madison County, Virginia

Elsewhere 
Repton School Dubai, a boarding school in Dubai
Repton, New South Wales, a town in New South Wales, Australia

People 
Humphry Repton (1752–1818), landscape gardener
Humphrey Repton (cricketer) (c. 1780–1819), English cricketer

Other uses 
 Repton, a tune in Hubert Parry's 1888 oratorio Judith, adopted at Repton School for the hymn "Dear Lord and Father of Mankind" 
 Repton, a character from the Cartoon Network series Storm Hawks
 Repton, a single entangled monomer in a system undergoing reptation
 Repton, a preserved British SR V class steam locomotive
 Repton (video game), the first in series of maze solving computer games by Superior Software
 Repton (1983 video game), a computer game by Sirius Software
 Repton Boxing Club, a boxing club in east London